= HOT 40 – The Biggest Pan-Hellenic Countdown Show =

HOT 40 - The New Pan-Hellenic Countdown Chart Show is Greece's biggest and most popular Top 40 Countdown, syndicated and broadcast over the country and also overseas in Australia to Greece's nationals overseas. The HOT 40 is broadcast to over 52 radio stations nationwide and also via major internet radio stations. The HOT 40 Countdown was created in November, 2009 by the Greek radio production company "RadioGOGO".

The HOT 40 Countdown as well as playing today's Greek Mainstream and International hits, also is innovative and gives new and unknown artists their chance to become heard on a Pan-Hellenic level, thus gaining recognition and more exposure to a wider audience. The segment is called the "Break-Thru Artist Chart" where four to five new bands/artists are featured every week from all over Greece.
